Clavulina geoglossoides is a species of coral fungus in the family Clavulinaceae. It occurs in New Zealand.

References

External links

Fungi described in 1970
Fungi of New Zealand
geoglossoides
Taxa named by E. J. H. Corner